Bligh Island is an island of the Nootka Sound area in British Columbia (Canada); it is adjacent to Nootka Island and Vancouver Island.

The island was named after William Bligh, of future HMS Bounty fame, who served as Master aboard ship during James Cook's third world voyage.  The southern portion of the island is included within Bligh Island Marine Provincial Park.

References

Islands of British Columbia
Nootka Sound region